Zac Champion (born June 29, 1984) is a former American football quarterback. 

Champion was released by the BC Lions on May 10, 2010. On June 7, 2010, Champion was signed by the Calgary Stampeders and was competing for third-string quarterback against Daryll Clark. After playing two disappointing pre-season starts, he lost the spot to Clark. One week later, Champion was cut down to the practice roster. On week four of the CFL season, he was placed on waivers, two weeks later. on October 20, he was signed to the practice roster for the Winnipeg Blue Bombers after Steven Jyles and Alex Brink were both injured.

Champion started as a quarterback for the Louisiana Tech University football team until his graduation following the 2007 season. His senior year, Champion's Bulldogs went 5-7.  Champion passed for 2221 yards and 13 touchdowns and throwing only two interceptions.

References

External links

Louisiana Tech bio
NFL Scouting report

1984 births
Living people
American football quarterbacks
Louisiana Tech Bulldogs football players
Players of Canadian football from Birmingham, Alabama
BC Lions players
Calgary Stampeders players
Players of American football from Birmingham, Alabama